The lawn bowls competition at the 1958 British Empire and Commonwealth Games took place in Cardiff, Wales, from 18 to 26 July 1958.

Medal table

Medallists

Results

Men's singles – round robin

+ Silver medal play off
Baker beat Jackson 21-18

Men's pairs – round robin

+ Silver medal play off 
South Africa beat Southern Rhodesia 17-10

Men's fours – round robin

+ Gold medal play off
England beat South Africa 22-13

References

See also
List of Commonwealth Games medallists in lawn bowls
Lawn bowls at the Commonwealth Games

Lawn bowls at the Commonwealth Games
Brit